Notre Dame High School for Girls was a private, Roman Catholic, all-girls, college prep 9-12 high school in Chicago, Illinois, United States. It was founded in 1938 by the Sisters of Notre Dame de Namur and in 2009, was incorporated by the Archdiocese of Chicago, making it part of the St. Ferdinand Parish. Its teachings were based on the educational philosophy of St. Julie Billiart, founder of the Sisters of Notre Dame de Namur. The school provides moral, academic, physical and social education.

On June 16, 2016, the Roman Catholic Archdiocese of Chicago announced that, after years of dwindling enrollment, the school would be closing its doors on July 1, 2016.

Notable alumnae
 Jaslene Gonzalez, winner of America's Next Top Model, Cycle 8
 Bonnie Hunt, actress from featured films such as Cheaper by the Dozen and Jumanji
 Nadine Velazquez, actress best known for her role as Catalina on TV's My Name is Earl
 Patti Solis Doyle, political adviser best known for her role as Campaign Manager for 2016 Presidential candidate Hillary Clinton

References

External links
 School website
 Sisters of Notre Dame de Namur website

Catholic schools in Chicago
Private high schools in Chicago
Catholic secondary schools in Illinois
Sisters of Notre Dame de Namur schools
Girls' schools in Illinois
Educational institutions established in 1938
1938 establishments in Illinois
Educational institutions disestablished in 2016
2016 disestablishments in Illinois